F.E.A.R. is the eighth studio album by American rock band Papa Roach. It was released on January 27, 2015.

"When you see the word, it looks like Fear. If you look deeper, it's Face Everything And Rise." Speaking to Loudwire, Jacoby Shaddix explained the meaning of this song: "It's about stepping up to your problems," he said, "and connecting with my God and walking through those things."

F.E.A.R. sold 24,425 copies in the United States in its first week of release to land at position No. 15 on the Billboard 200 chart, charting higher than their previous albums Time for Annihilation: On the Record & On the Road and The Connection, also outselling both of them. It is their first top 15 album in the UK since Lovehatetragedy, as well as their first album to chart higher in the UK than in the US. It also managed to chart in many territories worldwide where many of their previous releases failed to chart. As of April 2016, the album has sold 84,000 copies in the United States.

History
On February 4, 2014, the band announced that they will be going into the studio to record a new album.

On February 18, guitarist Jerry Horton stated that the first single should come out in July 2014, but the first official single (the title track) was not revealed until August, and the single release date was delayed until November.

On February 25, the band participated in a live chat and mentioned that they have already written 4 songs. They revealed the titles of three songs: "Broken as Me", "Gravity", and "War Over Me".

On April 24, during an interview for Loudwire, vocalist Jacoby Shaddix revealed more song titles from the album: "Never Have to Say Goodbye" and "Face Everything and Rise". On August 30, 2014, it was revealed that the title track, "Face Everything and Rise" would be the album's first single and that the video would be codirected by Shaddix.

The album was streamed on YouTube on January 22, 2015, five days before its scheduled release on the Eleven Seven Music YouTube channel.

Singles
The title track "Face Everything and Rise" was released digitally on November 4, 2014, as their first single.

The song "Gravity" was released on April 22, 2015, as their second single along with the music video.

The song "Falling Apart" was released on January 18, 2015, on Radio 1 Rock Show on BBC Radio 1 and was released on Christmas Day on Mainstream Rock as the third single.

The fourth single "Devil" was released on March 26, 2016.

The fifth and final single "Broken as Me" was released on April 26, 2016

Track listing

Personnel
 Jacoby Shaddix – lead vocals
 Jerry Horton – guitar, backing vocals
 Tobin Esperance – bass, backing vocals
 Tony Palermo – drums

Charts

References 

Papa Roach albums
Albums produced by Kevin Churko
2015 albums
Eleven Seven Label Group albums